America Says is an American television game show hosted by John Michael Higgins and broadcast on Game Show Network. The series consists of two teams of four guessing the top answers to fill-in-the-blank survey questions. It is basically a restructuring of the Audience Match portion of Match Game.

Gameplay

Main rounds 
Two teams of four compete, consisting of friends and family. One team is shown a fill-in-the-blank and its top seven answers, with the first letter of each word in each correct answer being shown as a clue. For example, if the question is "When I think of Italy, I think of [blank]," an answer might be "L__ T" for Leaning Tower. The length of the blank is a further clue to the length of the correct answer.

In each round, each team is given one question. The team has a total of 30 seconds to guess all seven answers correctly. The first player offers an answer and keeps giving answers until giving an answer that is not on the board, at which point control passes to the next player in line. This process continues (going back to the beginning of the line as often as necessary) until either all seven answers are given or time runs out. Players may not give answers out of turn; if a player does so, including before the previous player's answer is ruled incorrect, the answer is disregarded, and the team is given in a five-second penalty. The team is awarded 100 points for every correct answer, and a 1,000-point bonus (1,700 total) if they can get all seven answers within 30 seconds. If the team cannot guess all seven, then the opposing team is given a chance to steal the remaining answers at 100 points each. Steal attempts are untimed but end when either the board is completed or the stealing team gives an incorrect answer. In early episodes, the opposing team was allowed to confer on steals; during episodes filmed using a socially-distanced set during the COVID-19 pandemic, individual players give one answer each, without conferring.

Synonyms and word forms are acceptable if they correctly fill in the same blank(s): for example, "chefs" and "cooking" would both be acceptable for "cooks," but "physician" would not be acceptable for "doctor". As a general rule, other than questions that explicitly deal with synonyms for a given word, the show tries to avoid including two or more synonyms in the answers when they do not fill in the same blanks (for example, "actor" and "thespian" would not be separate answers for most questions unless the question were something like " is another word for a performer").

The second round is played the same way, with 200 points given for each correct answer and a 2,000-point bonus for all seven. Likewise, the third round is played for 300 points per answer and 3,000 bonus points for all seven. The team on the viewer's left starts the first two rounds; the team that is ahead after two rounds starts the third round (the team on the left starts the third round if there is a tie). The round ends immediately if the trailing team can no longer catch their opponents. The team with the most points after all three rounds wins $1,000 and the chance to play for $15,000 in the bonus round.

In the event of a tie after the third round, a tiebreaker is played between the team captains. The first letter of the top answer is shown, and then the question is shown. The first captain to buzz in is given the chance to answer. If the answer given is correct, that captain wins the game for his or her team. If the answer given is incorrect, then the other team wins automatically.

Bonus round
In the Bonus Round, the winning team has 60 seconds to correctly identify the top answers to four survey questions. The players are lined up in the same order around a central console with a large red skip button. Play starts again with the team captain and is similar to the main game: a correct guess allows the player to give another answer, a wrong answer passes control to the next player in line.

For the first survey question, only the top answer is needed, the second needs the top two answers, the third needs the top three answers, and the fourth and final question needs the top four answers.

If a team member feels they are stuck on a question, they can hit the skip Button (which stops the clock) and skip to the next question. They must return to the passed question after completing the other three in order to win the Bonus Round for $15,000. The skip button can only be used once during the Bonus Round, and cannot be used once three of the four questions are completed (as there is no other question with which to pass).

As in the main game, players must wait until it is their turn before offering an answer. If a player offers an answer out of turn, the team loses five seconds from their clock.

Once all the needed answers for each question are correctly guessed, the clock stops, and the next question is revealed. The guessing for each subsequent question begins with the player next in line (i.e. if Player Two gave the last correct answer for a question, the next question's guessing starts with Player Three).

If the team can give all ten correct answers before time runs out, their winnings are increased to $15,000. If they cannot, they leave with just the $1,000 from the Main Game.

On October 29, 2019, "The Canadians" (Ayumi Iizuka, Doug Morency, David Ivkovic, and Paul 'PK' Kingston) became the first team to complete a perfect game, amassing 10,400 points in three perfect rounds of 1,700 points, 3,400 points, and 5,100 points (plus a 200-point steal), and winning the bonus round.

Production
The series premiered on June 18, 2018. On August 14, 2018, Game Show Network renewed America Says for a 96-episode second season, which premiered on November 26, 2018.

On April 5, 2019, media reports stated that America Says had been renewed for a 160-episode third season, which premiered on July 22, 2019. On June 12, 2019, GSN and Sony Pictures Entertainment announced that the show would be launched in syndication for the 2019-20 television season. Sony elected not to bring the series back to syndication for the 2020-21 television season.

On March 9, 2020, Game Show Network renewed America Says for a fourth season, but production was delayed due to the COVID-19 pandemic. The season premiered on May 31, 2021.

On March 14, 2022, Game Show Network renewed America Says for a fifth season, which premiered on April 25, 2022.

Reception
Angela Henderson-Bentley of The Herald-Dispatch praised Higgins' performance as host, writing that he "is just as adept at hosting as he is at providing classic sitcom moments." Higgins was nominated for Outstanding Game Show Host at the 46th Daytime Emmy Awards.

America Says raised Game Show Network's ratings by 26% over its time slot lead-in, and raised its ratings for women aged 25–54 by more than 40%.

See also
Family Feud (similar in content)
2018 in American television

References

External links
 
 
 America Says on SideReel

2010s American game shows
2020s American game shows
2018 American television series debuts
English-language television shows
Game Show Network original programming
Television series by Entertainment One